Nebria turmaduodecima is a species of black coloured ground beetle from Nebriinae subfamily that is endemic to US state of California.

References

turmaduodecima
Beetles described in 1981
Beetles of North America
Endemic fauna of California
Fauna without expected TNC conservation status